Penn & Teller's Smoke and Mirrors is an unreleased video game starring the magician duo Penn & Teller that was planned for release initially on the Sega CD in April 1995. The game is a collection of several minigames and an adventure platform game. All the minigames, with one exception, were made for the sole purpose of enabling the player to fool their friends by different means, designating the games "scam minigames" and virtual tricks. Penn & Teller's Smoke and Mirrors is similar to the video Penn & Teller's Cruel Tricks for Dear Friends, which has the same purpose, and uses properties of the video medium itself for the tricks.

Smoke and Mirrors was developed by Imagineering and was scheduled to be published by Absolute Entertainment. The game was reviewed in several publications, but Absolute Entertainment went out of business before the game could be released. The creators were unable to find other companies interested in the game, and it was never released. It received attention when a copy circulated on the Internet in 2005 and has since gained a cult following, especially for the Desert Bus Minigame.

Gameplay

What's Your Sign?
Using the patented Personometer (devised by the Cosmic Research Organization for Clairvoyant Kinetics, or CROCK), Penn and Teller claim to be able to guess the player's astrological sign and their birthday based on a series of responses they give to questions. These questions ask the player to give a response within a range (e.g., "Sunglasses, on one side of the bar—hate them, never wear them. Other side: I'm Lou Reed, I never take them off.") In reality, the owner of the game enters the person's date of birth earlier via a secret menu. The secret menu features an introductory film in which Penn & Teller let their feelings on astrology be known, stating that it is only good for giving astrologists work and allowing people to not take responsibility for their actions. Penn, who is juggling, goes on to work out using the laws of physics and mathematics that Mars has as much gravitational pull on his body as the balls he is juggling.

Mofo the Psychic Gorilla
Originally from Penn and Teller's stage show, Mofo is a gorilla who claims that scientific experiments have given him psychic powers, though in the introductory film Penn and Teller say this is not true. In order to demonstrate his ability, Mofo claims that he can predict whatever card the user has pulled out of a pack of cards based on answers he has given to some questions (e.g., "Do you have any relatives on Venus?"). This trick involves the user either seeing the card the victim has picked, or hearing the victim say the card. When Mofo explains how to "make contact" using the controls, the user secretly enters a code and uses two green bits of mist that appear in Mofo's crystal ball to select both the suit of cards and the value of that card. This trick requires more practice than the others, but there is a practice menu available. Nevertheless, Penn and Teller advise the player if they mess up just to say, "Well bummer, I guess he isn't psychic after all."

Desert Bus

Considered by Penn to be the "best part" of the collection, Desert Bus is a simulation trick minigame and a featured part of Electronic Gaming Monthlys preview. It is the most notorious minigame in the actual game. The feat requires eight hours of continuous play in real time to complete.

The bus contains no passengers, there is little scenery aside from an occasional rock or bus stop sign, and there is no traffic. The road between Tucson and Las Vegas is simplified compared to the real highways: it is now completely straight. The bus veers to the right slightly, and thus requires the player's constant attention. If the bus stops, or veers off the road it will stall and must be towed back to Tucson, also in real time. If the player makes it to Las Vegas, one point is scored. The player has the option to make the return trip to Tucson for another point, a decision which must be made in a few seconds or the game ends. Players may continue to make trips and score points as long as their endurance lasts. Although the landscape never changes, an insect splats on the windshield about five hours through the first trip, and on the return trip the light fades, with differences at dusk, and later a pitch black road where the player is guided only with headlights. The light eventually returns at dawn, but due to a programming bug it will cycle endlessly between dawn and night for the remainder of the game. The game cannot be paused.

The game was designed to be as inoffensive as possible to prove the point that not all video games were corrupting influences. Penn Jillette commented in his radio show Penn Radio that the overly realistic nature of the game was in response to Janet Reno's comments in support of the moral panic about violent video games at the time (see video game controversies). He stated that there would have been a prize for the person or group to get the highest score in the game, substantiated by the various Desert Bus contest materials prepared for the release of the game. Penn said that the prize "was going to be, you got to go on Desert Bus from Tucson to Vegas with showgirls and a live band and just the most partying bus ever. You got to Vegas, we're going to put you up at the Rio, big thing, and then, you know, big shows." One player used a tool-assisted emulator, managing to obtain up to 99 points, although their claim that this is the maximum the game allows might have been an April fool's joke. A run of this length would have taken 33 days to complete in real time. 

The game has also spawned a charity event called "Desert Bus for Hope" an annual event that started in 2007 to raise money for Child's Play charity.

Buzz Bombers
Buzz Bombers is a two-player arcade shooter, where each player controls a Buzz Bomber to kill enemies to earn points. The game includes an introductory story: insectoid aliens have destroyed Earth, but some Earth creatures have managed to get on board their ship and threaten the larvae of the next generation. The queen declares that the Buzz Bombers must eliminate the threat and protect their young.

Like the other "scam" minigames, Player 1 will always have more points and win the level. Player 1 controls various cheating features with simple button combinations. One additional feature is a button combination to change the controller that is "in charge" of the "scam", which is useful if the "mark" gets suspicious and wants to switch controllers.

To finally reveal the prank, the player has to press all three buttons on the controller, which reveals a cut scene that gives the secret away. Penn & Teller claimed this is perfect payback to friends "who come over to your house, eat your food, drink your soda, play your games and always beat you."

Sun Scorcher
Sun Scorcher is a game resembling Space Invaders in which a player controls a spaceship that has to destroy alien invaders and the mothership. The prank in this game makes fun of video disclaimers as well as advertising buzzwords such as "Blast Processing" used during the 16-bit era. The game claims to have "thermographics" which are released by the mothership. A disclaimer (that the player cannot skip past, even though the game is still playable) appears beforehand, and a dramatic voice states that these thermographics make the screen dangerous to touch. The prank involves entering a code before playing, which causes the TV to cut to static after the third time the thermographics appear, suggesting the game has broken the TV. The owner is meant to act as though their hand has been burned. Like the other pranks, there is a practice mode, and Penn & Teller give some hints on how to milk this trick for maximum effect.

Smoke and Mirrors
Smoke and Mirrors is a mixture of platform, role-playing, and puzzle-solving games. The premise is that magic sensations Stinkbomb and Rot (a Siegfried and Roy parody) claim that magic is real. The player controls both Penn and Teller to expose them as frauds, although there are magicians (such as the first boss, The Great Escapo, who throws straitjackets at the player) all over the city working for them. Penn and Teller have a number of double-team moves. For example, Penn provides a distraction while Teller sneaks up behind the victim on hands and knees so that Penn can push them over. A pack of cards is their most common weapon.

At several moments, the player can call in stunt doubles to perform action scenes. The drawback is that all they can do is punch and kick, so the player eventually has to replace them to pick up any items they pass. Debbie Harry (Penn's girlfriend at the time) and Lou Reed (one of Penn's idols) both appear in the game; every shop the player encounters is either called "Debbie's" or "Harry's". Lou Reed appears in Impossible Mode, killing the duo with a blast of lightning from his eyes. A video of Reed appears commenting, "This is the impossible level, boys. Impossible doesn't mean very difficult. Very difficult is winning the Nobel Prize; impossible is eating the Sun."

Development
Penn & Teller: Smoke and Mirrors was developed by Imagineering and was intended to be published by Absolute Entertainment. It was planned as a collection of minigames, with games conceived by the magic duo Penn & Teller. It was scheduled for a release on the Sega CD in April 1995; 3DO, PC and Sega Genesis versions were also planned. The game was reviewed in several gaming publications, including Electronic Gaming Monthly and VideoGames. However, Absolute Entertainment went out of business before it could be released, and Smoke and Mirrors was placed on indefinite hold. It was ultimately never released; according to the game's costar Teller, "by the time the game was finished, the [Sega CD] format was dead. We were unable to find anybody interested in acquiring the game".

Skyworks Interactive, Inc. owns the rights to all unreleased Absolute games, except for certain handheld console versions of Super Battletank, A Boy and His Blob, and Turn & Burn, which are owned by Majesco Entertainment. However, since Penn & Teller were owed money when Absolute Entertainment went out of business, any rights pertaining to their intellectual property, likenesses and performance within the title were revoked.

As the game was never released, it survived only in the review copies sent to journalists. In 2005, a journalist who had kept his review copy sent it to Frank Cifaldi, editor of the website Lost Levels, which is dedicated to arcane and unreleased video games. Cifaldi posted a copy of Smoke and Mirrors and information about it on the Internet, reviving interest in the game.

Reception

Entertainment Weekly gave the game a B.

GamePro described Penn & Teller's Smoke and Mirrors as an acquired taste with a unique interface that makes it very difficult to categorize. They praised the high variety of games included while at the same time noting their uneven quality: "These two TV and stage stars offer something for almost everyone ... Some of it's incredibly boring; some of it has one-time appeal; some of it's hilarious. It's a lot like life."

VideoGames gave the game an average score of 6 out of 10 and described it as a tool to mess with friends. They praised Desert Bus as "brilliant in concept, if mind-numbingly boring in gameplay", but criticized the graphics and recommended it for fans of the duo.

Legacy

Desert Bus for Hope

In 2007, the sketch comedy troupe LoadingReadyRun posted videos of themselves playing Desert Bus, the game's most notorious segment, to raise money for the charity Child's Play. As of 2021 they have been repeating "Desert Bus for Hope" for 15 consecutive years, raising over 8 million dollars. It is the longest-running Internet-based fundraiser, and has received support from Penn and Teller themselves.

Remakes
In November 2011, Amateur Pixels released a version of Desert Bus for Android and iOS, with the proceeds going to Child's Play.

A 2013 video game called Desert Bus 2600 for the Atari 2600 video game console was reviewed by Retro Video Game Magazine at 3 out of 5 stars.

The 2014 driving game Roundabout contains a minigame called "Desert Limo" that pays homage to Desert Bus and likewise requires eight hours to complete.

In October 2016 Desert Bus was released for the Mattel Intellivision as a charity fundraiser for Child's Play.

On November 27, 2017, a free remake with virtual reality (VR) and multiplayer support was released on Steam, developed by Dinosaur Entertainment and published by Gearbox Software. The game can be played on the Oculus Rift and HTC Vive VR platforms, as well as traditional displays.

References

External links 
 A charity website from LoadingReadyRun.com based on Desert Bus

Absolute Entertainment games
Bus simulation video games
Cancelled 3DO Interactive Multiplayer games
Cancelled PC games
Cancelled Sega CD games
Cancelled Sega Genesis games
Minigame compilations
Parody video games
Video games developed in the United States
Video games set in Arizona
Video games set in Nevada
Works about magic (illusion)